Kimani Jones (born December 21, 1981) is an American football offensive lineman who is currently a free agent. Prior to his Arena Football career, he played football at Arkansas State University; as a senior, Jones earned First Team All-Sun Belt Conference honors.

In 2008, following his departure from Arkansas State, Jones joined the Arena Football League's Cleveland Gladiators. As a rookie, Jones appeared in all sixteen of the team's regular season games; moreover, he caught six passes for twenty yards and a touchdown. His career was interrupted by the AFL's 2009 decision to suspend operations; during this time, Jones signed with the Omaha Beef of the Indoor Football League, where he earned Second Team All-IFL honors. When the league returned in 2010, Jones signed on with the Bossier-Shreveport Battle Wings. He appeared in eleven games during his lone season with the team. In 2011, Jones joined the AFL's Kansas City Command; over two seasons, he would appear in all but two of Kansas City's games. The Command folded at the end of the 2012 season; following this, Jones sat out the entire 2013 Arena Football League season. On April 2, 2014, he signed with the San Jose SaberCats; Jones appeared in twelve games (starting nine) as the SaberCats won their first division title since 2008. In May 2015, following the SaberCats' 2014 playoff loss to the Arizona Rattlers, Jones rejoined the SaberCats; he won his first AFL Championship when San Jose beat the Jacksonville Sharks in ArenaBowl XXVIII at the end of the season. He resides in California.

References

External links
San Jose SaberCats bio

1981 births
Living people
African-American players of American football
American football offensive linemen
Arkansas State Red Wolves football players
Bossier–Shreveport Battle Wings players
Cleveland Gladiators players
Kansas City Command players
Omaha Beef players
People from Mound Bayou, Mississippi
People from Mound City, Missouri
Players of American football from Mississippi
Players of American football from Missouri
San Jose SaberCats players
21st-century African-American sportspeople
20th-century African-American people